Alfa Romeo II (rechristened Black Jack IV) is a maxi yacht designed in 2005 by Reichel/Pugh for yachtsman Neville Crichton. First-to-finish in the 2009 Transpacific Yacht Race ("the Transpac"), she also set a new elapsed-time Transpac race record for monohulls.

Alfa Romeo II is a "Reichel/Pugh 100" design measuring  overall. She features a  carbon fibre mast built by Southern Spars, water ballast, and a canting keel. She is thought to be capable of  downwind in a fresh breeze. Some of the boat's systems are operated via PLCs, automatically stepping up engine speed as power is required to operate the hydraulic ram actuating the canting keel, or disengaging the propeller when it is retracted into the hull to reduce drag.

History

2009 Transpac Race
Total crew of about seventeen sailors included Stanley Honey, navigator; Olympian Ben Ainslie, English Gold Medalist Finn sailor of the 2008 Summer Olympics; and members of the Ericcson 4 crew, recently victorious in the Volvo Ocean Race. According to the 7 July 2009 morning report, Alfa Romeo II broke the Transpac race record for most miles covered in one day, set in the 2005 race by Morning Glory, by sailing  in 24 hours. She improved that on both following days; on 8 July 2009, Alfa Romeo II reported ; on 9 July 2009, she reported . She was first to finish the 2009 Transpac race, in which she set a new elapsed-time record of 5 days, 14 hours, 36 minutes, 20 seconds. She has been first to finish in at least 140 races.

2009 Sydney to Hobart Yacht Race
In 2009, she was the first to finish the Sydney to Hobart Yacht Race.

Sponsorship
The Alfa Romeo yachts owned by Neville Crichton are sponsored by Alfa Romeo Automobiles S.p.A. of Turin, Italy. They own the Alfa Romeo name and other intellectual properties such as logos, emblems (used on Alfa Romeo III), and manner of depicting the name as shown on the mainsail of Alfa Romeo II in the infobox.

In 2006 the team is also sponsored by SLAM, an Italian company producer of technical sailing sportswear, that provides the team of technical clothing.

See also
Alfa Romeo I
Alfa Romeo III
Wild Oats XI

References

External links
Alfa Romeo Yacht Racing Team site
Alfa Romeo Yacht Racing Team news releases
Alfa Romeo II build details
2009 Transpac race crew list
Maxi Yacht Rolex Cup Victory in Sardinia
Giraglia Rolex Cup promotional information
Alfa Romeo II demonstrating speed at Malta Rolex Middle Sea Race 2006
Deck layout and detail photos of Alfa Romeo II

Ships built in New South Wales
Individual sailing vessels
2000s sailing yachts
Alfa Romeo
Sailing yachts designed by Reichel/Pugh
Sailing yachts built in Australia
Maxi yachts
Sydney to Hobart Yacht Race yachts